Elizabeth "Betsy" Sholl (born 1945) is an American poet who was poet laureate of Maine from 2006 to 2011 and has authored nine collections of poetry. Sholl has received several poetry awards, including the 1991 AWP Award, and the 2015 Maine Literary Award, as well as receiving fellowships from the National Endowment for the Arts and the Maine Arts Commission.

Sholl's poetry has been published in anthologies and in literary journals including Orion Magazine, Field, TriQuarterly, The Kenyon Review, The Massachusetts Review, and Ploughshares.

Career 
Sholl was one the founding members of Alice James Books, a non-profit publishing house at the University of Maine at Farmington, established in 1973 with the intent of widening women's access to publishing. Sholl published her first three poetry collections with Alice James Books: Changing Faces (1974), Appalachian Winter (1978) and Rooms Overhead (1986).

In 1991, Sholl's chapbook Pick a Card won the Maine Chapbook Competition, which was judged by Donald Hall. That same year, her poetry collection The Red Line won the Association of Writers & Writing Programs award for poetry. The National Endowment for the Arts gave Sholl an artist fellowship in 1994.

In 1997, Sholl's collection Don't Explain was selected by Rita Dove to receive the Felix Pollak Prize in Poetry. Dove, a previous holder of the position of US Poet Laureate, described Sholl's poems as "what narrative can aspire to – namely, the grace and ease of the lyric rhapsody".

Sholl served as Maine's third poet laureate from 2006 to 2011. This is an honorary five-year position, with the laureate chosen in a process overseen by the Maine Arts Commission and appointed by the Governor of Maine, then John Baldacci.

Sholl's collection Otherwise Unseeable won two prizes, the 2014 Four Lakes Prize in Poetry, and the 2015 Maine Literary Award for Poetry.

Sholl taught at the University of Southern Maine for over two decades. She teaches in the Master of Fine Arts program at the Vermont College of Fine Arts, and she has been a visiting poet at the University of Pittsburgh and at Bucknell University, and has twice received an Individual Artist Fellowship Award from the Maine Arts Commission.

Regarding poetry, Sholl has said that its main purpose "is to refresh or renew the language" and that "it renews the presence and aliveness of language".

Personal life and education
Born in Lakewood Township, New Jersey, Sholl grew up in Bricktown, New Jersey. In 1967, she gained a BA in English Literature from Bucknell University, in 1969 an MA from the University of Rochester, and in 1989 a MFA in writing from Vermont College. She moved to Maine in 1983 after stints in Boston and Big Stone Gap, Virginia, and now lives in Portland, Maine with her husband Doug.

Published works

Full-length poetry collections

Chapbooks

Contributions in anthologies

Contributions in literary journals

References

External links
 
 
 

Living people
Poets from Maine
Writers from Portland, Maine
People from Brick Township, New Jersey
People from Lakewood Township, New Jersey
University of Rochester alumni
Bucknell University alumni
University of Southern Maine faculty
Poets Laureate of Maine
National Endowment for the Arts Fellows
Vermont College of Fine Arts alumni
Poets from New Jersey
Vermont College of Fine Arts faculty
American women poets
1945 births
American women academics
21st-century American women